Absolutely Live is a live album released by the band Toto in 1993, with new vocalists Jenney Douglas-McRae, John James, and Donna McDaniel joining lead singer Steve Lukather. Initially released in 1993, the album has been subsequently re-released in 1999 on Sony International. After the release of the album, the band went on a brief hiatus.

Track listing

Personnel

Toto
 Steve Lukather – lead vocals, guitar
 David Paich – keyboards, vocals
 Mike Porcaro – bass guitar
 Simon Phillips – drums

Additional musicians
 John James– vocals
 Donna McDaniel– vocals
 Jenny Douglas-McRae – vocals
 John Jessel– additional keyboards, vocals, sound effects
 Chris Trujillo– percussion

Production
 Toto – producer
 Alfred Lagarde – producer
 Arnie Acosta – mastering
 Gina Zangla – art direction
 Sean O'Dwyer – assistant engineer
 James Guthrie – producer, mixing
 Ronald Tryber – engineer
 Ed Jansson – assistant engineer
 Max Rozenbeek – assistant engineer
 Joh Van Someren – assistant engineer
 Gert Vinke – assistant engineer
 Jack Anderson – photography
 Jens Schmidt – photography

Singles 
 "Africa" / "Africa" (live) (released in France)
 "With a Little Help from My Friends" / "Rosanna" (live) (released in EU)
 "I'll Be Over You" / "99" (live) (released in NL)

References

External links 
 

1993 live albums
Toto (band) albums